Paul Gunderson (born May 21, 1943) is an American rower. He competed in the men's coxed four event at the 1964 Summer Olympics.  He graduated from Harvard University.

References

1943 births
Living people
American male rowers
Olympic rowers of the United States
Rowers at the 1964 Summer Olympics
People from Lincoln County, Washington
Harvard Crimson rowers